Echternach Evangeliaria (Echternacher Evageliarien) is the name given to a number of notable medieval evangeliaria produced in Echternach abbey:
the evangeliary of St. Willibrord, an insular ms. made ca. 690, now BNF Lat. 9389.
another evangeliary associated with St. Willibrord, made c. 710, now in Augsburg University library
 an insular evangeliary of  the early 8th century, made either in Echternach or Trier, now kept in Trier cathedral
  Codex aureus Epternacensis of the Ottonian period (mid 11th century), now GNM  Hs. 156 142, Nuremberg
An Ottonian ms. of c.   1043–1046, now Escorial, Cod. Vitr. 17, Madrid.
Catholic liturgical books
Medieval manuscripts